Mudanjiang is a prefecture-level city in Heilongjiang province, China.

Mudanjiang may also refer to:

 Mudan River, a river in Heilongjiang, China
 Songjiang Province, or Mudanjiang province, China